Stephen II of Troyes (died 1047), sometimes called Etienne, was a Count of Troyes and Meaux from 1037 to 1047. He was the son of (Eudes) Odo II, Count of Blois and, Chartres, Champagne, Troyes and Meaux, and of Ermengarde of Auvergne.

He married Adèle and had a son, Eudes II who was Count of Troyes and of Meaux, then of Aumale.

References

Sources

Year of birth missing
1047 deaths
Counts of Troyes
House of Blois